The Men's rings at the 2015 Summer Universiade in Gwangju was held on 7 July at the Gwangju Women's University Universiade Gymnasium.

Schedule
All times are Korea Standard Time (UTC+09:00)

Results

References

Results

External links
Official website

Men's rings